Maria Lúcia Dahl (20 July 1941 – 16 June 2022) was a Brazilian actress.

Filmography
 (1965)
 (1966)
 (1967)
 (1967)
The Brave Warrior (1968)
Macunaíma (1969)
Guerra Conjugal (1974)
 (1974)
 (1975)
 (1975)
 (1976)
 (1977)
A Árvore dos Sexos (1977)
 (1977)
 (1978)
 (1979)
 (1979)
 (1980)
 (1980)
I Love You (1981)
Mulher Objeto (1981)
 (1994)
Quem Matou Pixote? (1996)
 (2000)
 (2002)
 (2005)
 (2011)

References

1941 births
2022 deaths
Actresses from Rio de Janeiro (city)
Brazilian film actresses
Brazilian telenovela actresses
20th-century Brazilian actresses
21st-century Brazilian actresses